P4 sp. z o.o., known as Play (until January 2022, also as Play Communications SA, former parent company of P4 registered in Luxembourg), is a Polish cellular telecommunications provider. Play was founded in 2007 and has gradually increased its local market share, up to 27% . In September 2020, Play became part of French Iliad. Before being sold, Iceland's Novator Partners, led by Icelandic businessman Thor Bjorgolfsson, acquired a large stake in the company. As of November 20, 2020, Iliad owns 96,66% of Play.

Network

Play is the biggest cellular network in Poland. PLAY uses EGSM 900 and GSM1800 for its 2G services, UMTS 2100 and UMTS 900 for 3G and LTE800, LTE1800, LTE2100 and LTE 2600 for LTE. Its MCC is 260–06. Thanks to domestic roaming with Polkomtel (Plus) and Era (T-Mobile.pl), Play is a nationwide cellular carrier.

Native Network
As of November 3, 2013, Play Mobile has 3288 EGSM 900 BTS, 4143 UMTS 2100 nodeB and 2175 UMTS 900 nodeB's. UMTS 900 and UMTS 2100 network Play calls the 4G network. Currently, 82% of population is covered with Play's native 4G network and 40% of the population with 2G network. 4G is available in more than 300 cities and towns around Poland. Play started building its 3G network at the beginning of its existence (2007) and announced that its goal is to cover all of Poland with UMTS while provide GSM services through roaming. Play began building its GSM network in March 2009 in apparent bid to reduce roaming costs. EGSM 900 BTS and UMTS 900 nodeB use the same licence frequency. In place when are EGSM 900 usually is not UMTS 900.
Play Mobile Broadband (Play Online) products does not used 2G network.

On February 13, 2013 the company won the tender for the frequency of 1800 MHz. On February 19, 2013, Play filed in the Office of Electronic Communications applications for booking three blocks from the frequency band 1800 MHz. The new frequency will be used probably for to build LTE network or shared network (LTE and DCS).

Roaming
On September 6, 2006 Play signed a domestic roaming agreement with Plus operator - Polkomtel. It allows Play subscribers to access Plus' GSM network as well as UMTS network. Roaming is nationwide, free and unlimited. In addition, Play subscribers can manually pick Plus GSM network despite presence of Play's native network.

In July 2010, Play signed a domestic roaming agreement with Orange operator - Centertel. The initial agreement included a limited territorial coverage. In November 2011, Play and Orange signed an annex to the agreement, expanding the coverage of the whole Polish territory. However, Plus and Orange domestic network cannot be used with Play's Mobile Broadband products.

During the Mobile World Congress 2013 in Barcelona Play announced that the third domestic roaming partner will be T-Mobile operator - PTC.

Play also has agreements with most of the operators worldwide to provide international roaming around the globe for its postpaid and prepaid customers.

Virgin Mobile Poland is using the Play network (including Orange network, excluding Plus network).

IPO 
In July 2017 the company was offered to the public and listed on the Warsaw Stock Exchange, with plans to raise €1.03bn from its first IPO.

References

External links
Play official website

Mobile phone companies of Poland
Internet in Poland
Companies based in Warsaw
Telecommunications companies established in 2007